The Sub-Balkan Valleys are row of 11 valleys running from the Bulgarian border with Serbia east to the Black Sea. They are separating the Balkan mountains from a chain of other mountains known as Srednogorie which includes Vitosha and Sredna Gora. There is great abundance of mineral waters. They are divided into two parts: Western (higher) and Eastern (lower). The western valleys include: Burel Valley; Sofia Valley; Saranska Valley; Kamarska Valley. The eastern valleys are: Zlatitsa Valley; Karlovo Valley; Kazanlak Valley;  Valley; Sliven Valley; Karnobat Valley; Aytos Valley.

References 

Geography of Bulgaria
Valleys of Bulgaria
Landforms of Bulgaria
Valleys of Europe